
Transcription factor NF-E2 45 kDa subunit is a protein that in humans is encoded by the NFE2 gene.

It is involved in megakaryocyte production.

Interactions 

NFE2 has been shown to interact with CREB-binding protein.

References

Further reading

External links 
 
 

Transcription factors
Human proteins